The Welfreighter was a Second World War British midget submarine developed by the Special Operations Executive (SOE) for the purpose of landing and supplying agents behind enemy lines. It only saw action once and was not particularly successful.

Design
After the success of the X class midget submarines, an attempt was made by SOE's technical division, Inter Services Research Bureau (ISRB) under the command of Lt. Colonel John Dolphin to design a submersible craft for covert  missions. These would include the landing and supplying agents behind enemy lines, intelligence gathering work off hostile coastlines, and delivering explosive depth charges to enemy shipping routes. This design became the Welfreighter. It was intended that the  Welfreighter could travel surfaced by night towards an enemy-held coastline, submerging as and when necessary to avoid detection. The special agents would then be disembarked and go ashore along with their equipment, stored in the special containers. The Welfreighter would then sail out to sea and submerge itself to  wait until the next night. At a pre-arranged time, or upon receiving a sound signal from the landing party (made by a mechanical device) it would surface again and pick up the agents, before heading out to sea either to rendezvous with a larger surface vessel or return to base under its own power.

The initial concept was a true miniature submarine which could from a distance be mistaken for a conventional motor boat and which could hold two agents along with its crew of two men, and which could also carry up to one ton of supplies in sealed containers.

Design work began towards the end of 1942 with the building of a 1/4 scale model which was used for tests in an experimental tank at Vickers' plant at St. Albans. By February 1943 the tests had produced several alterations to the original design including modifications to the hull form to make it stable under tow at speeds of  - .

Prototypes
Following the model tests, permission was granted for the construction of a full size prototype at the SOE establishment known as The Frythe near Welwyn Garden City.

The first prototype had little resemblance to the later versions. A second prototype was begun in June and was tested throughout the autumn and winter.

A third prototype was begun in September 1943. Its speed was less than the specification, at  maximum while surfaced, with a mere  submerged.

Production

In early 1944 a specification for a final Mk III version was proposed by SOE, which eventually entered series  production. A further  could be added if part of the storage capacity was used. The accommodation had also been enlarged; as well as the two crewmen, 4 passengers could be carried on short voyages, or 3 for longer trips. The cargo capacity had also been enhanced to enable between 1.5 and 2 tons to be carried.

Underwater endurance had also been augmented, the craft now being capable of supporting 6 persons for up to 40 hours submerged. Finally, surface speed had been increased to  cruising speed, or  maximum. Even the electric propulsion was upgraded: it could deliver 2-3 knots. By now it was apparent that it was unlikely that the Welfreighter would be needed in Europe, therefore consideration was given to its use in the Far East.

Due to the urgency of production it was not possible to create a dedicated factory. As had happened with the Welman submarine the year before, production was contracted out to specialised engineering firms already engaged in production of war material. In mid-1944, the Letchworth company of Shelvoke and Drewry Ltd. was awarded a contract to produce Welfreighters. By early September an order for up to 34 Welfreighters was placed for delivery as soon as possible after 1 October. Security surrounding the  production of the Welfreighter was tight, and few non-vetted employees knew the truth until after the end of the war.

Completed craft were transported at night under canvas covers to Station IX at Welwyn, where they were fitted out, the compass and periscope and secret equipment fitted. The craft were then balanced, trimmed, and pressure tested in the establishment's water tank. They were then transported onwards to Fishguard in Wales, for sea trials.

Appearance
The Welfreighter outwardly resembled a conventional  motor boat. While surfaced it was propelled by a  Gardner 4LW   diesel omnibus engine driving a 4-bladed propeller, while underwater propulsion was provided by two  electric motors, driving a pair of small propellers. Two "masts" on the craft's foredeck housed a Barr and Stroude periscope and a magnetic compass. A dummy mast and sail could be attached to these masts to help disguise the craft as a fishing smack. The foredeck was raised up to give some headroom inside the craft, and was fitted with small square viewports.

To the rear of the main structure was a raised deck, beneath which were housed 6 high pressure air cylinders. To the rear of this area was a cargo well, fitted at the stern with a drop-down tailgate. This could house seven cylindrical drums of cargo. Carefully loaded so as to give a slight positive buoyancy, these drums could hold equipment for use by agents or saboteurs and could be floated out through the tailgate and towed ashore by agents, either swimming or using an inflatable boat.

Each Welfreighter was manned by a Sub Lieutenant RNVR as Commander, and a Naval Engine Room Artificer (ERA) or Army mechanic (REME). Up to four special agents could travel as passengers, although two would be more usual. These would commonly be Army personnel, who would be expected to assist with handling the craft while on the surface.

Service

Europe
Before the Welfreighter became properly operational the secret war in Europe was nearly over. In late 1944 plans were discussed to deploy the craft to the Adriatic, to assist operations in the Balkans, where SOE was involved in supporting partisans in northern Greece, Albania, and Yugoslavia.

Trained Welfreighter crews were ready for operations through the autumn of 1944, but neither Combined Operations HQ or SOE ever required anything of them.

Far East
Two Welfreighters were shipped to Fremantle, Australia, in late 1944, to become part of the clandestine Services Reconnaissance Department (commonly known as Z Special Unit). Extensive trials were conducted, including towing trials and exercises using high-powered motor launches and Motor Torpedo Boats. One source suggests that 12 were sent to Australia in 1945.

References

Midget submarines
Submarines of the United Kingdom
Special Operations Executive